La Torre d'en Besora is a municipality of Castellón, Valencia, Spain.

The town is located in the flat area of the comarca of Alt Maestrat, with the mountains of the Serra d'Esparreguera rising close to it. It has a population of 182 inhabitants.

See also
Castillo o Torre

References

External links 

 Torre d'en Besora official page 
 Institut Valencià d'Estadística
 Portal de la Direcció General d'Administració Local de la Generalitat
La Torre d'En Besora tourism

Municipalities in the Province of Castellón
Alt Maestrat
Maestrazgo